The 1954 All England Championships was a badminton tournament held at the Empress Hall, Earls Court, London, England, from 17–21 March 1954.

Final results

Judy Devlin and Sue Devlin represented the United States, they were the daughters of former champion Frank Devlin of Ireland.

Men's singles

Section 1

Section 2

+ Denotes seeded player

Women's singles

Section 1

Section 2

References

All England Open Badminton Championships
All England Badminton Championships
All England Open Badminton Championships in London
All England Championships
All England Badminton Championships
All England Badminton Championships